El Matador is a custom car built by Bill Cushenbery during 1959–1961. It was his first show car.

Cushenbery began work on El Matador in late 1959 as a showcase for his talents and a rolling advertisement. It started as a 1939 Ford, chopped  and sectioned . '57 Olds parking lights were used as taillights. The nerf bar bumpers were adapted from upper bumper rails off a 1950 Pontiac.

He scrounged parts from Seaside Auto Wreckers, operated by Vick Irvan (father of Ernie Irvan). The rear window was a windshield from a 1951 Chevrolet fastback, mounted upside-down.

The car featured vertically-stacked, inward-canted headlights (a common customizing idea at the time), with hand-formed steel front end and chrome mesh grille.

El Matador debuted in February 1961 at the Oakland Roadster Show.

Cushenbery sold the car to Bob Larivee, Sr.

El Matador and Exodus, which appeared the same year, drew a lot of attention to Cushenbery and a lot of custom work for his shop.

Featured appearances 
Twenty Top Customs. Spotlite Book 526
Rod & Custom, November 1961
Customs Illustrated, March 1963
Popular Customs, January 1966
1001 Custom Car Ideas. Argus Book 207.
Custom Rodder, Summer 1993
Custom Rooder, January 1994
Custom Rodder, July 1994
Kustoms Illustrated #13

Notes

Sources

Further reading 
Barris, George. 20 Top Customs. Petersen Publishing/Spotlight Books, 1962.
Dregni, Michael. The All-American Hot Rod. Motorbooks, 2009.
Thacker, Tony, and Southard, Andy. Custom Cars of the '50s. Motorbooks, 1994.

External links 
Pinterest 
 P.214.info 

Modified vehicles
Automotive styling features
One-off cars
Ford vehicles
1930s cars
1960s cars
Kustom Kulture
Individual cars